Akbarabad-e Yek (also Romanized as Akbarābād-e Yek; also known as Akbarābād) is a village in Siriz Rural District, Yazdanabad District, Zarand County, Kerman Province, Iran. At the 2006 census, its population was 16, in 6 families.

References 

Populated places in Zarand County